Live, Vol. Four is the fourth live album from The Avett Brothers. The album and its concert DVD counterpart were released on December 18, 2015. The vinyl edition was released on September 30, 2016. It contains 14 tracks, including four covers and two never-released original songs.

Live, Vol. Four was recorded at the PNC Arena in Raleigh, North Carolina, on December 31, 2014. Many of the tracks feature Valient Himself of the North Carolina band Valient Thorr as Father Time.

Reception

Francesco Marano of Zumic gave the album a positive review, writing that "...you can hear, and almost feel, the band’s energy through the night" of the 2014 New Year’s Eve concert. Marcy Donelson of Allmusic gives a more mixed review, that although "over-sung and over-played... their performance has the uplifting infectiousness of a gospel choir."

Track listing

Personnel
Scott Avett - vocals, banjo, acoustic guitar, piano, kick drum
Seth Avett - vocals, acoustic guitar, electric guitar, piano, hi-hat
Bob Crawford - backing vocals, upright bass, electric bass, fiddle
Paul Defiglia - backing vocals, keyboard, organ, upright bass
Tania Elizabeth - backing vocals, violin
Joe Kwon - backing vocals, cello
Mike Marsh - drums
Bonnie Avett - vocals on "Ten Thousand Words" and "Happy Trails"
Jim Avett - vocals on "Happy Trails"
Valient Thorr - vocals on "The Boys Are Back in Town" and "Happy Trails"

Charts

References

The Avett Brothers albums
2015 live albums